Sepulca is an extinct genus of stem sawflies in the family Sepulcidae.

The genus Sepulca was identified by Alexandr Pavlovich Rasnitsyn. It was named by his colleague and a science-fiction author Kirill Eskov after fictional entities called sepulki, found in Stanisław Lem's The Star Diaries and Observation on the Spot.<ref> Каракоз Роман. Где живут сепульки: [О двух видах палеонтологических перепончатокрылых — Sepulka mirabilis и Sepulenia syricta] // Новая интересная газета (Киев). — 2004. — № 1. — С. 5. — (Блок Z: Просто фантастика). Аннотация
Quote: Оказывается, сепулек, которые оказались вовсе не моллюсками, а перепончатокрылыми насекомыми, открыл Александр Павлович Расницын (кстати, работающий в одной лаборатории с известным писателем Кириллом Еськовым). Он-то и посылал в свое время Лему свою книжку, где, кроме прочего, были описаны Сепулька удивительная (Sepulca mirabilis) и Сепуление со свистом (дословно – свистящее: Sepulenia syricta).</ref> The relation to Lem's sepulki is understandable in both Polish and Russian, but their English translation obscures their association with ancient insects as they are translated as Scrupts in English editions of Lem's novels. Sepulca includes two species, as well as a number of subspecies.

Species
These two species belong to the genus Sepulca:
 † Sepulca mirabilis Rasnitsyn, 1968
 † Sepulca mongolica'' Rasnitsyn, 1993

References

Sawflies
Prehistoric insect genera
Commemoration of Stanisław Lem